Héctor Marcelo "Tito" Speranza is an Argentine personal trainer and actor of theater and television.

Career
Speranza finished his studies in the technical school Confederación Suiza.
 
Speranza rose to fame in 2011, due to his participation in the 7th season of Bailando por un Sueño, hosted by Marcelo Tinelli. In this program, he went through different styles of dancing with partner Nadia Hair. He made it to the final, but lost to Hernán Piquín (professional dancer and actor) and Noelia Pompa.

Speranza made a brief replacement for Beto César and Melina Creco (famous tango dancer) in the 8th season of the same competition.

Speranza acted in theater for the first time in Despedida de Solteros (2011), with Nazarena Vélez, Paula Chaves and Pedro Alfonso. Later, Speranza had a role in the comedy Viaje de Locura, in Villa Carlos Paz. It premiered in the "Holiday" theater.

Appearance

Television

Cinema

Personal life
Speranza married personal trainer and former bodybuilder, Marcela Villagra on December 7, 2012, in San Benito's church, Palermo, Buenos Aires.

References

External links
  El Trece's Showmatch website
  Tito Speranza's official fan website

Living people
Argentine people of Italian descent
Participants in Argentine reality television series
Argentine male stage actors
Reality dancing competition contestants
Year of birth missing (living people)
Bailando por un Sueño (Argentine TV series) participants